Belet may refer to:

Robert A. Belet (1914–42), a United States Marine Corps Silver Star recipient
USS Belet (DE-599), a United States Navy destroyer escort converted during construction into the high-speed transport USS Belet (APD-109)
USS Belet (APD-109), a United States Navy high-speed transport in commission from 1945 to 1946

 Belet (surname)

See also 
 Bellet
 Bellett